Fiore II is the third compilation album by Japanese recording artist Alisa Mizuki, released through Nippon Columbia on December 20, 1997. The thirteen-track set features a selection of songs from Mizuki's third and fourth studio albums, Arisa III: Look and Cute, chosen by Mizuki herself, as well as five original songs. Fiore II is Mizuki's last album released under Nippon Columbia. The album is also Mizuki's first to credit her as Alisa Mizuki, rather than Arisa Mizuki.

Leading up to the compilation's release, the five original tracks, "Don't Be Shy," "Kaze mo Sora mo Kitto...," "Promise to Promise," "Forever Love," and "Days," were released as singles. Fiore II is Mizuki's first album to include the "Straight Run" version of "Promise to Promise," which was not included on Mizuki's previous compilation album Arisa's Favorite: T.K. Songs (a remix version was included instead). "Days" was released as the final single from the compilation as well as the first single from Mizuki's fifth studio album Innocence.

Fiore debuted at number 69 on the Oricon Weekly Albums chart with 3,870 copies in its first week, becoming Mizuki's second lowest charting album.

Commercial performance 
Fiore debuted on the Oricon Weekly Albums chart at number 69 with 3,870 copies sold in its first week. The album charted for three weeks and has sold a total of 9,680 copies.

Track listing

Charts and sales

References 

1997 greatest hits albums
Alisa Mizuki albums
Nippon Columbia albums
Japanese-language albums